

Ottoman Empire
 Principality of Abkhazia – Kelesh Begi (1789–1806)

Portugal
 Angola – Fernão António de Noronha, Governor of Angola (1802–1806)
 Macau –
 Jose Manuel Pinto, Governor of Macau (1800–1803)
 Caetano de Sousa Pereira, Governor of Macau (1803–1806)

Spanish Empire
Viceroyalty of New Granada –
 Pedro Mendinueta y Múzquiz, Viceroy of New Granada (1797–1803)
 Antonio José Amar y Borbón, Viceroy of New Granada (1803–1810)
Viceroyalty of New Spain –
 Félix Berenguer de Marquina (1800–1803)
 José de Iturrigaray y Aréstegui (1803–1808)
Captaincy General of Cuba – Salvador de Muro y Salazar, Governor of Cuba (1799–1812)
Spanish East Indies – Rafael María de Aguilar y Ponce de León, Governor-General of the Philippines (1793–1806)
Commandancy General of the Provincias Internas – Nemesio Salcedo y Salcedo (1802–1813)
Viceroyalty of Peru – Gabriel de Avilés y del Fierro (1801–1806)
Captaincy General of Chile – Luis Muñoz de Guzmán, Royal Governor of Chile (1802–1808)
Viceroyalty of the Río de la Plata – Joaquín del Pino y Rozas (1801–1804)

United Kingdom
 Cayman Islands – William Bodden, Chief Magistrate of the Cayman Islands (1776–1823)
 Malta Protectorate – Alexander Ball, Civil Commissioner of Malta (1802–1809)
 New South Wales – Philip Gidley King, Governor of New South Wales (1800–1806)

Colonial governors
Colonial governors
1803